Mylothris primulina, the primrose dotted border, is a butterfly in the family Pieridae. It is found in Nigeria. Its habitat consists of dense forests.

References

Butterflies described in 1897
Pierini
Endemic fauna of Nigeria
Butterflies of Africa
Taxa named by Arthur Gardiner Butler